Ovalau (pronounced ) is the sixth largest island in Fiji. It is located in Lomaiviti Archipelago. Situated at 17.70° South and 178.8° East, (60 km north east from the national capital Suva and 20 km off the east coast of Viti Levu), the island is about 13 kilometers long and 10 kilometers wide. It covers a total area of 106.4 square kilometers and has a population of around 9,100, approximately half the Lomaiviti population.  Levuka, Fiji's former capital, is the largest of 24 towns and villages on the island.

Ovalau is characterized by its rugged topography, with little flat land apart from the Lovoni Valley in the centre of the island.  The island is an eroded volcanic crater with a narrow belt of flat to undulating country between the encircling lagoon and the steep crater sides. The highest peaks are Nadelaiovalau, with an altitude of 625 meters, in the east, and Tomuna, 526 meters, in the south.

Transport around Ovalau
There is one road which circles the island. However, between the villages of Rukuruku and Buresala the road is little more than a track, as travel between these points is uncommon, most traffic being directed from these two villages to Levuka. Levuka Airport, which handles twice-daily Air Fiji flights to and from Suva is located on the west of the island, next to the Bureta District School compound. There is one flight in the morning, and one in the evening, with only the evening service operating on Sundays. Flights cost around FJ$150 return.

Ferry services also connect Ovalau to Viti Levu - the Patterson Brothers Shipping Company LTD ferry company runs a service between Levuka, Buresala, Natovi, and Suva depending on the day.

Transport around the island is mainly by carrier. There is one bus service, which runs once daily from the west of Ovalau to Levuka in the morning, and returns at 5pm, and is mainly used by schoolchildren and PAFCO workers.
At an unknown date, two environment designers from the game developer studio, Bohemia Interactive, visited the island to collect geographical data and environmental data for the studio's new expansion for their game, Arma 3 Apex.

References

External links 

 
 Levuka Fiji

Islands of Fiji
Lomaiviti Province